Bolko von Richthofen (September 13, 1899 – March 18, 1983) was a German archaeologist and a distant relative of the family of Manfred von Richthofen, the "Red Baron". He is sometimes confused with his distant cousin and namesake, Karl Bolko von Richthofen (1903–1971) – the youngest brother of the fighter ace.

Richthofen was born in Mertschütz (Polish Mierczyce), Silesia, and fought in World War I. After the war ended, he participated as a Freikorps volunteer during the Silesian Uprisings. In the early post-war period he entered tertiary studies and quickly became an eminent scholar.

Member of the NSDAP from 1933, he wrote several antisemitic and anti-Slavic works. During World War II he worked in the antisemitic Ahnenerbe organisation.

He is well known for a bitter dispute about the ethnicity of the Lusatian and Pomeranian cultures with the Polish archaeologist Józef Kostrzewski.

In 1964 he received the Bundesverdienstkreuz. He died in Seehausen am Staffelsee, Bavaria.

Further reading
Archaeology in Poland. Włodzimierz Rączkowski. "Expansion and reaction: the concept of Polish archaeology in the discourse with German archeologists"
 Uta Halle: "Die Externsteine sind bis auf weiteres germanisch!" Prähistorische Archäologie im Dritten Reich. Sonderveröffentlichungen des Naturwissenschaftlichen und Historischen Vereins für das Land Lippe Band 68 (Bielefeld 2002). . Buchrezension für H-Soz-u-Kult.
 Zur Biographie Bolko von Richthofens: Georg Schaufler: Zur Biographie des Verfassers. In: B. von Richthofen, Schlesien und die Schlesier. Eine landes- und stammeskundliche Übersicht. Die Schlesier vor und nach der Vertreibung aus der Heimat Band 1 (Wolfenbüttel 1967), S. 44–47. 
 Hein Brand, Die Vor- und Frühgeschichte als "hervorragend nationale Wissenschaft". Über die Instrumentalisierung eines Zweiges der Geschichtswissenschaft

External links
 

1899 births
1983 deaths
People from Jawor County
People from the Province of Silesia
German archaeologists
Nazi Party politicians
Christian Social Union in Bavaria politicians
Militant League for German Culture members
German military personnel of World War I
Officers Crosses of the Order of Merit of the Federal Republic of Germany
Bolko
20th-century Freikorps personnel
People from Garmisch-Partenkirchen (district)
20th-century archaeologists